El Madrileño (English: The Madrilenian) is the second studio album by Spanish rapper and singer-songwriter C. Tangana. Written by Tangana and co-produced with Alizzz, the album was released through Sony Music on February 26, 2021. With this record, Tangana explored a more organic and guitar oriented sound to his previous hip hop and urban releases, focusing in a collaboration album as a tribute to his wide roots. Twelve out of fourteen tracks are in collaboration with other renowned Latin folk, rock or flamenco artists from many countries and ages. The result is a colored mosaic of Tangana's teenage influences and the adoption of a new alter ego named after the album.

The record became a commercial success, debuting atop the Spanish Charts and peaking at eight on the US Billboard Top Latin Albums chart. It was the best selling album in Spain of 2021. Promotion prior to its release encompassed the release of three singles: "Demasiadas Mujeres", "Tú Me Dejaste de Querer"—both accompanied by music videos produced by Little Spain—and "Comerte Entera". The lead single topped the charts in Spain as the third one reached the top ten. "Tú Me Dejaste de Querer" quickly managed to become Tangana's best performing single, debuting at number one in Spain and entering the charts in Argentina and the Billboard Global 200. Despite not receiving radio promotion, "Ingobernable", featuring the Gipsy Kings, debuted at number one on the PROMUSICAE weekly list. A reissue, La Sobremesa, featuring late singles like "Ateo" as well as the recording of Tangana's NPR Tiny Desk concert, was released on February 18, 2022.

With El Madrileño, C. Tangana scored his first Latin Grammy nominations as a performer. He had previously received four awards for his contributions as a co-writer on El Mal Querer, the sophomore album by Rosalía, and for her song "Malamente", which he also co-wrote. El Madrileño was nominated for Album of the Year and won Best Engineered Album while the Omar Apollo duet "Te Olvidaste" was nominated for Record of the Year and Best Alternative Song. "Nominao", featuring Jorge Drexler, won the latter category while "Hong Kong", featuring Andrés Calamaro, was awarded Best Pop/Rock Song. Longtime friend and musical collaborator of Tangana, Alizzz, scored a Producer of the Year nomination.

Background 
On April 24, 2020, C. Tangana released the song "Nunca Estoy", which was well received by critics and acclaimed for moving beyond the trap and hip hop sounds that he had become known for. The song reached the top spot on the PROMUSICAE chart, becoming Tangana's first number one hit in his career. It was followed by the release of his first extended play as a signed artist, Bien:(the month after. In September, Tangana revealed to Forbes that his third studio album would be very different from his previous releases and that it would be called El Madrileño, in reference to his hometown Madrid and to the new alter ego he adopted during the making of this new project.

In late January 2021, the singer began to tease the release of the album through social media. On January 23, he revealed the cover art and, three days later, the tracklist and release date.

Recording 
Shortly after announcing the album's release date, Tangana offered an interview with El País where he stated that "If it had not been for the pandemic, I would have started to record El Madrileño by the end of 2021. I had a recorded album of urbano music, a lot of rap, overcoming trap. When the pandemic began and I began to scratch, it seemed to me that I was not up to the times. This one is".

Promotion 
On October 8, Tangana released the lead single of El Madrileño. "Demasiadas Mujeres" became an instant hit in Spain, debuting at the top of the PROMUSICAE chart and being gold-certified in only a week for selling over 20,000 copies. The song was, in fact, very different out of all the other things on the singer's repertoire and included a Holy Week marching band from Cádiz. The song included a message of frustration and elements of folk. Its respected music video included a scene of Tangana's own funeral as well as references to his past relationships with Rosalía and Berta Vázquez. On November 6, Tangana released featuring Niño de Elche and La Húngara "the most important song of his career", which he named "Tú Me Dejaste de Querer". He defined the track as a combination of rumba and bachata with elements of flamenco music. Its teaser reached over two million views on Twitter and another million and a half on Instagram. The track broke the record for the most-streamed song in Spain in a 24-hour period with 1,6 million national streams. As for international numbers, "Tú Me Dejaste de Querer" debuted at 31 on the Spotify Global chart, marking the first entry of Tangana on the list. The track also peaked at number one in Spain and was directly certified Gold after one week. The track was promoted at LOS40 Music Awards 2020. In January, a third single "Comerte Entera", in collaboration with Brazilian singer and guitarist Toquinho, was released to critical acclaim.

In September 2021, a clothing collection in collaboration with Bershka, inspired in the album, was released.

Tour 
A concert tour in support of El Madrileño, Sin Cantar ni Afinar Tour, was announced on November 14, 2021, consisting of fifteen initial dates. It began on February 19, 2022 in Málaga. Tickets went on sale on November 16 to overwhelming demand. On July 11, 2022 additional dates were announced for the "Sin Cantar ni Afinar LATAM Tour 22", a series of additional concerts to take place in Mexico, Colombia and Argentina.

Dates

Canceled shows

Notes

Track listing 
All tracks are produced by C. Tangana, Alizzz and Victor Martínez, except where noted.

Notes
 "Cambia!" is stylized in all caps.

Sample credits
 "Demasiadas Mujeres" contains a sample of "El Amor" by La Banda Rosario De Cadiz; and a sample of "Campanera" by Joselito.
 "Tú Me Dejaste de Querer" contains an interpolation of "Son Ilusiones" by Los Chichos
 "Comerte Entera" contains a sample of "Daniele Puxa O Bonde" by DJ Wagner and MC Daniele.
 "Nunca Estoy" contains an interpolation of "Como Quieres que Te Quiera" by Rosario; and an interpolation of "Corazón Partío" by Alejandro Sanz.
 "Muriendo de Envidia" contains an interpolation of "Lola" written by Fernández Salvador and performed by El Pescaílla
 "Cuándo Olvidaré" contains an excerpt of Pepe Blanco on Cantares; a sample of "Slide" by H.E.R. featuring YG; an interpolation of Pasan los Días by La Tana; and an interpolation of Nostalgia by Enrique Cadícamo.
 "Hong Kong" contains a lyrical excerpt of "Mil Horas" by Los Abuelos de la Nada
 "Yate" contains an interpolation of "Vete" by Los Amaya
 "Los Tontos (Live at NPR's Tiny Desk)" contains an interpolation of Bizarre Love Triangle by New Order

Charts

Weekly charts

Year-end charts

Certifications

Release history

See also 
 2021 in European music
 2021 in Latin music

References 

Sony Music albums
Spanish-language albums
2021 albums
Albums produced by Federico Vindver
Albums produced by Rafa Arcaute
Latin Grammy Award for Best Engineered Album